Solo Flight is the second album by former Wings guitarist Laurence Juber, released in 1990.

Track listing
All songs by Laurence Juber
 "A Bit of a George" - 2:40
 "Breath of Air" - 2:50
 "The Stepney Two Step" - 2:13
 "Tombeau (Elegy)" - 1:54
 "I'll Think of You & Smile" - 2:58
 "Open for Business" - 3:00
 "Solo Flight" - 2:13
 "In Your Arms" - 3:41
 "Ferdinand's Lute" - 2:47
 "Elevations of the Heart" - 3:22
 "This Process (Is a Process)" - 3:52
 "Joanna" - 2:43
 "Barnet Fair" - 5:27
 "Slow Dance" - 3:04

Personnel
Laurence Juber – guitar
Production notes:
Laurence Juber – producer
James Lee Stanley – executive producer
Avi Kipper – engineer
Joe Gastwirt – mastering
Brian Aris – photography

References

Laurence Juber albums
1990 albums